Ramongo is a town in the Ramongo Department of Boulkiemdé Province in central western Burkina Faso. It is the capital of the Ramongo Department and has a population of 2,500.

References

Populated places in Boulkiemdé Province